The following is a list of supermarket chains in Ireland.

Large supermarkets

Smaller supermarkets and convenience stores

References

Ireland, Republic of
Supermarket chains

Supermarket Chains